R. Indira Kumari is a politician and former minister from the Indian state of Tamil Nadu. She was elected to the Tamil Nadu legislative assembly as an Anna Dravida Munnetra Kazhagam candidate from Natrampalli constituency in 1991 election. She served as a Social welfare minister in the J. Jayalalithaa cabinet during 1991–96. She switched parties and joined the Dravida Munnetra Kazhagam (DMK) in 2006.

On 29-Sep-21, Indira Kumari, her husband Babu convicted in a misappropriation of funds case, filed in 1996. Special court for MLAs and MPs sentenced them to 5-year imprisonment

References 

Dravida Munnetra Kazhagam politicians
Tamil Nadu ministers
Living people
20th-century Indian women politicians
20th-century Indian politicians
21st-century Indian women politicians
21st-century Indian politicians
Year of birth missing (living people)
Tamil Nadu MLAs 1991–1996
Women members of the Tamil Nadu Legislative Assembly